Jeremy Ratchford (born August 6, 1965) is a Canadian actor. He starred as Nick Vera on the TV series Cold Case.

Career
While in Canada, Ratchford played Marvel Comic book character Banshee in the live action TV super hero film Generation X. Ratchford also starred in a series of Canadian Crispy Crunch candy bar commercials.

When he relocated to Hollywood, California, he played a sexual predator on an episode of NYPD Blue and two episodes of The Practice, as well as the vampire Lyle Gorch in the Buffy the Vampire Slayer episodes "Bad Eggs" and "Homecoming" before being cast on Cold Case. On Cold Case, he played detective Nick Vera.

Filmography

Film

Television

References

External links

1965 births
Living people
Canadian male film actors
Canadian male stage actors
Canadian male television actors
Canadian male voice actors
Male actors from Kitchener, Ontario